Major-General Joseph Porter Crowdy  FRIPH (19 November 1923 – 28 June 2009) was a British soldier and military doctor, and Commandant of the Royal Army Medical College.

He was an Honorary Physician to H. M. the Queen, 1981–1984.

Background and education
The son of Lieutenant-Colonel Charles R. Crowdy, by his marriage to Kate Porter, Joseph Porter Crowdy was educated at Gresham's School, Holt, Norfolk (1933–1942), and the University of Edinburgh (1942–1947). He took the degrees of MB and BCh in 1947, a Diploma in Tropical Medicine & Hygiene in 1956, and finally in 1957 Diplomas in Public Health and in Industrial Health.

Career
Crowdy was a house surgeon at the Norfolk and Norwich Hospital from 1947 to 1948, before joining the Royal Army Medical Corps in 1949. He served in North Africa (1952–1955), then in Singapore (1960–1962), and in 1963 was appointed as Head of Applied Physiology at the Army Personnel Research Establishment, where he remained until in 1973 he became Professor of Army Health at the Royal Army Medical College. He was next Senior Medical Officer, Land Forces Cyprus (1976–1978), then Director of Army Preventative (Medicine 1978–1981) before his final posting as Commandant of the Royal Army Medical College (1985–1988).

Publications
Editor, Royal Army Medical Corps Journal, 1978–1983

Family
In 1948, Crowdy married Beryl Elisabeth Sapsford (died 1997); they had four daughters.

Honours and appointments
Fellow of the Faculty of Public Health Medicine, 1974
Member, Faculty of Occupational Medicine, 1981
Fellow, Royal Institute of Public Health, 1982
Honorary Physician to the Queen, 1981–1984
Companion of the Order of the Bath, 1984

References

Joseph Porter Crowdy bio at Royal Army Medical Corps website

1923 births
2009 deaths
Alumni of the University of Edinburgh
British Army major generals
20th-century British medical doctors
Companions of the Order of the Bath
People educated at Gresham's School
Royal Army Medical Corps officers
Place of death missing
Fellows of the Faculty of Public Health
20th-century British Army personnel